Following is a list of municipal presidents of Jerez, in the Mexican state of Zacatecas:

References

Jerez